Urediniospores (or uredospores) are thin-walled spores produced by the uredium, a stage in the life-cycle of rusts.

Development
Urediniospores develop in the uredium, generally on a leaf's under surface.

Morphology
Urediniospores usually have two dikaryote nuclei within one cell. In mass they are usually pale brown in contrast to teliospores which are generally dark brown.

See also

Chlamydospore
Urediniomycetes
Pycniospore
Aeciospore
Teliospore
Ustilaginomycetes
 Rust fungus: Spores

References
C.J. Alexopolous, Charles W. Mims, M. Blackwell, Introductory Mycology, 4th ed. (John Wiley and Sons, Hoboken NJ, 2004)  

Germ cells
Fungal morphology and anatomy
Mycology